John Pak (born December 18, 1998) is an American professional golfer.

Pak was raised in Scotch Plains, New Jersey, Pak attended Scotch Plains-Fanwood High School for one year before moving to Orlando, Florida to train.

As a junior golfer, he was named to the Rolex Junior First Team All-American by the American Junior Golf Association. He was ranked seventh in the 2017 signing class and 15th among all junior golfers according to Golfweek. 

In 2017, he began playing collegiate golf for the Florida State Seminoles men's golf team. During his time as a Seminole, Pak has won the Sea Best Invitational, 2019 & 2020 Mobile Sports Authority Intercollegiate, Rod Myers Invitational, 2018 & 2020 Seminole Intercollegiate, and the 2019 ACC Championship. 

Pak was selected to the 2019 Walker Cup team.

Pak swept the college golf awards in 2021 as a senior, winning the Haskins Award, Ben Hogan Award, and Jack Nicklaus Award. He turned professional in June 2021 and made his professional debut at the Palmetto Championship on the PGA Tour.

Accolades
The only player with a perfect record in the 2019 Walker Cup
2019 Jack Nicklaus Award Semifinalist
2018 ACC Freshman of the Year
 Established the single-year scoring average record at Florida State, shooting 69.56 as a sophomore

Amateur wins
2014 AJGA Annapolis Junior
2018 Seminole Intercollegiate, Rod Myers Invitational
2019 Sea Best Invitational, Mobile Sports Authority Intercollegiate, ACC Championship
2020 Mobile Sports Authority Intercollegiate, Seminole Intercollegiate
2021 The Calusa Cup

Source:

Results in major championships
Results not in chronological order in 2020.

"T" = tied
LA = Low amateur
NT = No tournament due to COVID-19 pandemic

U.S. national team appearances
Walker Cup: 2019 (winners), 2021 (winners)
Arnold Palmer Cup: 2020

References

External links
John Pak at the GolfStat official site

American male golfers
Florida State Seminoles men's golfers
Golfers from New Jersey
People from Scotch Plains, New Jersey
Scotch Plains-Fanwood High School alumni
Sportspeople from Union County, New Jersey
1998 births
Living people